The ITF Indian Harbor Beach is a tournament for professional female tennis players played on outdoor clay courts. The event is classified as a $60,000 ITF Women's Circuit tournament and has been held in Indian Harbour Beach, Florida, United States, since 2006.

Past finals

Singles

Doubles

External links 
 ITF search 

ITF Women's World Tennis Tour
Clay court tennis tournaments
Recurring sporting events established in 2006
Tennis tournaments in Florida
2006 establishments in Florida
2018 disestablishments in Florida
Recurring sporting events disestablished in 2018
Indian Harbour Beach, Florida
Sports in Brevard County, Florida